Fukagawa held a mayoral election on October 1, 2006. Junkichi Kawano was elected but later arrested for bid-rigging forcing a by-election in January (see 2007 Fukagawa mayoral by-election).

References 

Fukagawa, Hokkaido
2006 elections in Japan
Mayoral elections in Japan
October 2006 events in Japan